Water skiing competitions at the 2023 Pan American Games in Santiago, Chile are scheduled to be held between October 21 and 24, 2023 at the Los Morros Lagoon. 

There will be a total of ten events held, equally split among men and women.

Qualification system

A total of 48 athletes will qualify to compete at the games. The host nation, Chile, automatically qualifies four athletes in water ski and two in wakeboard. The top seven nations at the 2022 Pan American Water Skiing Championship will each receive four athlete quotas. A further 7 spots are made available for wakeboard qualifiers in each event.

Participating nations
A total of 10 countries qualified athletes. The number of athletes a nation entered is in parentheses beside the name of the country.

Medal summary
Men's events

Women's events

References

Events at the 2023 Pan American Games
2023